There are many prehistoric sites and structures of interest remaining from prehistoric Britain, spanning the Stone Age, Bronze Age and Iron Age. Among the most important are the Wiltshire sites around Stonehenge and Avebury, which are designated as a World Heritage site.

Structures and sites

Agricultural structures, mines and roads

Bathampton Down, Iron Age earth enclosure with Bronze Age round barrows in the area.
Bindon Hill, Iron Age earth enclosure.
Great Orme, Bronze Age copper mines and an Iron Age hill fort.
Grime's Graves, Neolithic flint mining complex.
The Ridgeway, ancient trackway.
Sweet Track, ancient causeway.
Tarr Steps, late Bronze Age clapper bridge.

Burial structures

 Arthur's Stone, Herefordshire, Neolithic chambered tomb.
Barclodiad y Gawres, Neolithic cruciform passage grave.
Belas Knap, Neolithic long barrow.
Bryn Celli Ddu, Bronze Age passage grave on the site of a Neolithic stone circle and henge.
Clava cairn, Bronze Age circular chamber tomb cairn.
Devil's Lapful, Neolithic long cairn in Northumberland.
Duggleby Howe, round barrow.
Dartmoor kistvaens, burial tombs or cists found in Dartmoor in Devon.
Fairy Toot, oval barrow.
Five Marys, group of round barrows in Dorset.
Julliberrie's Grave, unchambered earthen Neolithic long barrow.
King's Quoit, Neolithic burial chamber in Pembrokeshire.
Lanyon Quoit, dolmen.
Maeshowe, Neolithic chambered cairn and passage grave.
Oakley Down Barrow Cemetery, group of round barrows in Dorset.
Pentre Ifan, Neolithic dolmen.
The Poind and his Man, burial mound and standing stone in Northumberland.
Poor Lot Barrow Cemetery, group of round barrows in Dorset.
Seven Barrows, site of bowl barrows, bell barrows, saucer barrows and disc barrows.
Spinsters' Rock, Neolithic dolmen.
St Lythans, Neolithic dolmen.
Stoney Littleton Long Barrow, Neolithic chambered tomb.
Thickthorn Down Long Barrows, Neolithic long barrows in Dorset.
Three Brothers of Grugith, Neolithic dolmen in Cornwall.
Tinkinswood, Neolithic dolmen.
Trethevy Quoit, Neolithic burial chamber.
Wayland's Smithy, Neolithic long barrow and chamber tomb.
West Kennet Long Barrow, Neolithic chambered long barrow.
Wor Barrow, Neolithic long barrow in Dorset.

Causewayed enclosures

Barkhale Camp, West Sussex
Coombe Hill
Flagstones Enclosure, Dorset
Hembury
Robin Hood's Ball
Stonehenge
Windmill Hill
Whitesheet Hill, Wiltshire

Fortifications

Hill forts

Badbury Rings, Iron Age hill fort.
Barbury Castle, Iron Age hill fort.
Bat's Castle, Iron Age hill fort.
Beacon Hill, late Bronze Age hill fort.
Berry Castle, Iron Age hill fort
Black Ball Camp, Iron Age hill fort
Blackbury Camp, Iron Age hill fort.
Blacker's Hill, Iron Age hill fort.
Brean Down, Iron Age hill fort.
Brent Knoll, Iron Age hill fort.
Burledge Hill, Iron Age hill fort.
Bury Castle, Iron Age hill fort.
Cadbury Camp, Iron Age hill fort.
Cadbury Castle, Iron Age hill fort.
Cadbury Hill, Iron Age hill fort.
Cannington Camp, Bronze and Iron Age hill fort
Castell Dinas Brân, Iron Age hill fort.
Castell Henllys, Iron Age hill fort.
Castle an Dinas, Iron Age hill fort.
Castle Hill, Iron Age hill fort.
Castle Old Fort, Stonnall, Iron Age hill fort.
Clatworthy Camp, Iron Age hill fort.
Coney's Castle, Iron Age hill fort.
Cow Castle, Iron Age hill fort.
Danebury, Iron Age hill fort.
Daw's Castle, Iron Age hill fort.
Devil's Dyke, Iron Age defensive ditch.
Dinas Dinlle, Iron Age hill fort.
Dolebury Warren, Iron Age hill fort.
Dowsborough, Iron Age hill fort.
Dumbarton Castle, Iron Age stronghold.
Dunadd, Iron Age hill fort.
Dundon Hill (or Dundon Camp), Compton Dundon, Iron Age hill fort.
Durnovaria, Iron Age hill fort.
Eildon Hill, Late Bronze Age hill fort.
Eggardon Hill, Iron Age hill fort.
Ham Hill, Bronze and Iron Age hill fort
Hambledon Hill, Iron Age hill fort and Neolithic causewayed enclosures.
Hod Hill, Iron Age hill fort.
Kenwalch's Castle, Iron Age hill fort.
Kingsdown Camp, Iron Age hill fort.
Lambert's Castle, Iron Age hill fort.
Maes Knoll, Iron Age hill fort.
Maesbury Castle, Iron Age hill fort.
Maiden Castle, Iron Age hill fort.
Norton Camp, Bronze Age hill fort
Old Sarum, Iron Age hill fort and Neolithic settlement.
Old Winchester Hill, Iron Age hill fort and Bronze Age barrows.
Oram's Arbour, Iron Age hill fort.
Pen Dinas, Iron Age hill fort.
Pilsdon Pen, Iron Age hill fort.
Plainsfield Camp, Iron Age hill fort.
Poundbury Hill, Iron Age hill fort and Middle Bronze Age settlement.
Ruborough Camp, Iron Age hill fort.
Segsbury Camp, Iron Age hill fort.
Sharpenhoe Clappers, Iron Age hill fort.
Small Down Knoll, Bronze Age hill fort
Solsbury Hill, Iron Age hill fort.
Stantonbury Camp, Iron Age hill fort.
Stanwick Iron Age Fortifications, Iron Age hill fort.
Sweetworthy, Iron Age hill fort.
Traprain Law, Iron Age hill fort.
Trendle Ring, Iron Age hill fort.
Tre'r Ceiri, Iron Age hill fort.
Uffington Castle, Iron Age hill fort.
White Castle, Iron Age hill fort.
Wincobank, Iron Age hill fort.
Worlebury Camp, Worlebury Hill, Iron Age hill fort.

Other defensive structures

Broch of Mousa, broch.
Dun Carloway, broch.
Edin's Hall Broch, broch.
Eilean Dòmhnuill, crannog.
Wansdyke

Henges

Arbor Low, late Neolithic Class II henge.
Avebury, Neolithic henge and stone circles.
Ballymeanoch, Neolithic henge with a small burial cairn as well as standing stones and stone circles.
The Bull Ring, Neolithic Class II henge.
Catholme ceremonial complex, Neolithic henge enclosure, timber circle and pit alignments
Castle Dykes Henge, Neolithic Class I henge.
Drove Cottage Henge, Heavily damaged Neolithic henge
Durrington Walls, Neolithic Class II henge.
King Arthur's Round Table, Neolithic Class II henge.
Maumbury Rings, Neolithic henge later used as a Roman amphitheatre.
Mayburgh Henge, Neolithic henge with standing stones.
Priddy Circles, four stone circles and two round barrows
Ring of Brodgar, Neolithic henge and stone circle.
Thornborough Henges, three aligned Neolithic henges.
Waulud's Bank, a possible Neolithic henge.
Woodhenge, Neolithic Class I henge and timber circle.

Hill figures

Long Man of Wilmington, hill figure of uncertain age, but probably not prehistoric.
Uffington White Horse, Bronze Age hill figure.

Settlement sites

Carn Brea, Cornwall
Cheddar Gorge and its caves, forming part of the Cheddar Complex
Chysauster Ancient Village, Cornwall
Din Lligwy, Anglesey
Flag Fen, Cambridgeshire
Glastonbury Lake Village
Harrow Hill, West Sussex
Huckhoe Settlement, Northumberland
Little Woodbury, Wiltshire
Martin Down Enclosure, Hampshire
Morgan's Hill Enclosure, Wiltshire
Rotherley Down Settlement, Wiltshire
The Sanctuary, Wiltshire
Shaftoe Crags Settlement, Northumberland
Skara Brae, Orkney
Shearplace Hill Enclosure, Dorset
Shipton Hill Settlement, Dorset
Slate Hill Settlement, Northumberland
Smedmore Hill Settlement, Dorset
South Lodge Camp, Wiltshire
Thundersbarrow Hill, West Sussex
Woodcutts Settlement, Dorset

Stone monuments

Achavanich
Beckhampton Avenue
Bennachie
Birkrigg stone circle
Boscawen-Un
Boskednan stone circle
The Bridestones
Callanish Stones
Castlerigg stone circle
Doll Tor
Drizzlecombe
Grey Wethers
The Hurlers
Long Meg and Her Daughters
The Longstones
Mên-an-Tol
The Merry Maidens
Merrivale
Mitchell's Fold
Nine Ladies
Rollright Stones
Rudston (Rudston Monolith)
Stalldown Barrow
Standing Stones of Stenness
Stanton Drew
Stones of Scotland
Swinside
Temple Wood
Threestoneburn Stone Circle
Torhouse
Tregeseal East stone circle
Yellowmead stone circle

Structures of unknown purpose

Grim's Ditch, bank and ditch earthworks.
Seahenge, Bronze Age timber monument.
Silbury Hill, the tallest prehistoric man-made mound in Europe.
The Gop, Neolithic mound in Wales.
 Stonehenge, large area of stone circles

See also
 Prehistoric Scotland
 Prehistoric Wales

References

External links
 Winter Solstice and Long Barrows has a listing of Long Barrow coordinates
 Prehistoric Britain – about-britain.com
 Scottish Archaeological Research Framework -- Chronological and regional overview of Scottish archaeology

Structures
 
 
 
Prehistoric structures
Prehistoric